Go Fish or Fish is a card game usually played by two to five players, although it can be played with up to 10 players. It can be played in about 5 to 15 minutes.

The game 
Five cards are dealt from a standard 52-card deck (54 counting Jokers) to each player, or seven cards if there are only two players. The remaining cards are shared between the players, usually spread out in a disorderly pile referred to as the "ocean" or "pool".

The player whose turn it is to play asks another player for their cards of a particular face value. For example, Alice may ask, "Bob, do you have any threes?"  Alice must have at least one card of the rank she requested. Bob must hand over all cards of that rank if possible, and is responsible for delivering the cards to the player no matter their location. If he has none, Bob tells Alice to "go fish" (or just simply "fish"), and Alice draws a card from the pool and places it in her own hand. Then it is the next player's turn – unless the card  Alice drew is the card she asked for, in which case she shows it to the other players, and she gets another turn. When any player at any time has four cards of one face value, it forms a book, and the cards must be placed face up in front of that player.
Play proceeds to the left. When all sets of cards have been laid down in books, the game ends. The player with the most books wins.

Variations 
There are a number of variations of these basic rules:
 A player gives only one card when asked.
 A player forms and lays down pairs instead of 4-card books.
 A player whose call is unsuccessful and draws the card being asked for does not get another turn.
 A player asks for a specific card instead of a rank. A player must still have at least one card of the named rank in order to ask, and must expose that card when asking. This is similar to Happy Families.
 If the other players got all their matches and one player has a card left while no more go-fish cards to draw, the player with the remaining card loses the game.
 Books are saved by each player, face down. When the main play is finished, a further stage of play starts, with the player who has most books. That player may ask another player for a rank that they remember that player has; if correct they win the pair; if incorrect, play passes to the other player. The winner is the player who has eventually collected a pair of every rank.
 Jokers can be used to create a pair by asking another player if they have any jokers in their hand. Two jokers form one pair.
 Instead of going round in a circle the turn switches to the person saying go fish.

Strategy 
If, when fishing, a player draws a rank they did not have, they should ask for it on their next turn. Otherwise, they should rotate among the ranks that they already hold. In the more difficult variants, strategy often requires memorizing which cards each player possesses. Unlike many card games, Go Fish depends on the honor system; lying about the contents of one's hand is difficult to prevent.

It is often beneficial for the player to conceal the cards they hold in order to prevent other players from knowing which cards they can ask for. This can be accomplished by consistently asking different players for the same rank of card.

Special card decks 
Instead of using a standard 52 playing card deck, various specialty decks have been manufactured including the 169 count playing card Kids Classic Go Fish Card Game by U.S. Games Systems. Other specialist card packs which can be used to play similar games have also been produced including the Safari Pals packs which use animal characteristics to form the sets and packs which use personalized names to form the sets.

There is a similar game called Quartets.

See also 
 Literature (card game)
 Happy Families – Card game from the UK with almost identical rules.

References

External links 
 Rules of Card Games: Go Fish

Quartet group
Year of introduction missing
Card games for children

pt:À Pesca